Week-End Pass is a 1944 American comedy film directed by Jean Yarbrough and written by Clyde Bruckman. The film stars Martha O'Driscoll, Noah Beery Jr., George Barbier, Andrew Tombes, Irving Bacon and Dennis Moore. The film was released on February 14, 1944, by Universal Pictures.

Plot

Cast        
Martha O'Driscoll as Barbara 'Babs' Bradley / Barbara Lake
Noah Beery Jr. as Johnny Adams
George Barbier as Commander 'Pops' Bradley
Andrew Tombes as Constable
Irving Bacon as Sheriff Todd
Dennis Moore as Ray
Edgar Dearing as Motor Cop
Pierre Watkin as John James 'J.J.' Kendall
Lotte Stein as Hilda
Eddie Acuff as Waikowsky
Jack Rice as Jenkins
Perc Launders as Murphy
The Delta Rhythm Boys as Themselves
Lew Diamond as himself
Mayris Chaney as himself
Bill Shawn as himself
Grady Sutton as Pajama Man
Carol Hughes as Maisie

References

External links
 

1944 films
1940s English-language films
American comedy films
1944 comedy films
Universal Pictures films
Films directed by Jean Yarbrough
American black-and-white films
1940s American films